{{Infobox settlement
| name                     = Yobe
| official_name            =
| type                     =State
| image_skyline            = File:Tulutulu in yobe state Nigeria.jpg
| image_alt                =
| image_caption            = 
| image_flag               = Yobe_State_Flag.png
| flag_alt                 = Flag of Yobe State
| flag_size                = 120px
| image_seal               = Yobe State Government.png
| seal_alt                 = Seal of Yobe State
| nickname                 = Pride of the Sahel
| image_map                = Nigeria Yobe State map.png
| map_alt                  = 
| map_caption              = Location of Yobe State in Nigeria
| coordinates              = 
| coor_pinpoint            = 
| coordinates_footnotes    = 
| subdivision_type         = Country
| subdivision_name         = 
| established_title        = Date created
| established_date         = 27 August 1991
| seat_type                = Capital
| seat                     = Damaturu
| government_footnotes     = 
| governing_body           = Government of Yobe State
| leader_party             = APC
| leader_title             = Governor  (List)
| leader_name              = Mai Mala Buni
| leader_title1            = Deputy Governor
| leader_name1             = Idi Barde Gubana (APC)
| leader_title2            = Legislature
| leader_name2             = Yobe State House of Assembly
| leader_title3            = Senators
| leader_name3             = 
| leader_title4            = Representatives
| leader_name4             = List
| unit_pref                = Metric
| area_footnotes           = 
| area_total_km2           = 45,502
| area_rank                = 6th of 36
| area_note                = 
| elevation_footnotes      = 
| elevation_m              = 
| population_footnotes     = 
| population_total         = 2,321,339
| population_as_of         = 2006 census
| population_est           = 4,000,000 
| pop_est_as_of            = 2021
| population_rank          = 32nd of 36
| population_density_km2   = auto
| population_note          = 
| demographics_type1       = GDP (PPP)
| demographics1_footnotes  = 
| demographics1_title1     = Year
| demographics1_info1      = 2007
| demographics1_title2     = Total
| demographics1_info2      = $2.01 billion
| demographics1_title3     = Per capita
| demographics1_info3      = $843
| timezone1                = WAT
| utc_offset1              = +01
| postal_code_type         = postal code
| postal_code              = 620001
| area_code_type           = 
| area_code                = +234
| iso_code                 = NG-YO
| blank_name_sec1          = HDI (2018)
| blank_info_sec1          = 0.365 · 35th of 37
| website                  = 
| footnotes                =
}}Yobe''' was created on 27 August 1991. It is a mainly agricultural state, and it is a state located in northeastern Nigeria.  Yobe State was carved out of Borno State. The capital of Yobe State is Damaturu; its largest and most populated city is Potiskum.

LGAs 
Yobe State consists of 17 local government areas (or LGAs). They are:

 Bade
 Bursari
 Damaturu
 Geidam
 Gujba
 Gulani
 Fika
 Fune
 Jakusko
 Karasuwa
 Machina
 Nangere
 Nguru
 Potiskum
 Tarmuwa
 Yunusari
 Yusufari

External links 

 Yobe State Government homepage
 UCLA Yobe Languages Project
 Erdal Can Alkoçlar
 Nigerian Post Office, with a map of LGAs of the state

Reference 

Yobe State
Local Government Areas in Yobe State